A chronicle (from Greek  chroniká, from , chrónos – "time") is a historical account of events arranged in chronological order, as in a timeline. Typically, equal weight is given for historically important events and local events, the purpose being the recording of events that occurred, seen from the perspective of the chronicler.  A chronicle which traces world history is a universal chronicle. This is in contrast to a narrative or history, in which an author chooses events to interpret and analyze and excludes those the author does not consider important or relevant.

The information sources for chronicles vary. Some are written from the chronicler's direct knowledge, others from witnesses or participants in events, still others are accounts passed down from generation to generation by oral tradition.  Some used written material, such as charters, letters, and earlier chronicles. Still others are tales of unknown origin that have mythical status. Copyists also changed chronicles in creative copying, making corrections or in updating or continuing a chronicle with information not available to the original chronicler.  Determining the reliability of particular chronicles is important to historians.

Many newspapers and other periodical literature have adopted "chronicle" as part of their name. Various fictional stories have also adopted "chronicle" as part of their title, to give an impression of epic proportion to their stories.

Subgroups
Scholars categorize the genre of chronicle into two subgroups: live chronicles, and dead chronicles. A dead chronicle is one where the author assembles a list of events up to the time of their writing, but does not record further events as they occur. A live chronicle is where one or more authors add to a chronicle in a regular fashion, recording contemporary events shortly after they occur. Because of the immediacy of the information, historians tend to value live chronicles, such as annals, over dead ones.

The term often refers to a book written by a chronicler in the Middle Ages describing historical events in a country, or the lives of a nobleman or a clergyman, although it is also applied to a record of public events. The earliest medieval chronicle to combine both retrospective (dead) and contemporary (live) entries, is the Chronicle of Ireland, which spans the years 431 to 911.

Chronicles are the predecessors of modern "time lines" rather than analytical histories. They represent accounts, in prose or verse, of local or distant events over a considerable period of time, both the lifetime of the individual chronicler and often those of several subsequent continuators. If the chronicles deal with events year by year, they are often called annals. Unlike the modern historian, most chroniclers tended to take their information as they found it, and made little attempt to separate fact from legend. The point of view of most chroniclers is highly localised, to the extent that many anonymous chroniclers can be sited in individual abbeys.

It is impossible to say how many chronicles exist, as the many ambiguities in the definition of the genre make it impossible to draw clear distinctions of what should or should not be included. However, the Encyclopedia of the Medieval Chronicle lists some 2,500 items written between 300 and 1500 AD.

Citation of entries
Entries in chronicles are often cited using the abbreviation s.a., meaning sub anno (under the year),  according to the year under which they are listed. For example, "ASC MS A, s.a. 855" means the entry for the year 855 in manuscript A of the Anglo-Saxon Chronicle. The same event may be recorded under a different year in another manuscript of the chronicle, and may be cited for example as "ASC MS D, s.a. 857".

English chronicles
The most important English chronicles are the Anglo-Saxon Chronicle, started under the patronage of King Alfred in the 9th century and continued until the 12th century, and the Chronicles of England, Scotland and Ireland (1577–87) by Raphael Holinshed and other writers; the latter documents were important sources of materials for Elizabethan drama. Later 16th century Scottish chronicles, written after the Reformation, shape history according to Catholic or Protestant viewpoints.

Cronista
A cronista is a term for a historical chronicler, a role that held historical significance in the European Middle Ages. Until the European Enlightenment, the occupation was largely equivalent to that of a historian, describing events chronologically that were of note in a given country or region. As such, it was often an official governmental position rather than an independent practice. The appointment of the official chronicler often favored individuals who had distinguished themselves by their efforts to study, investigate and disseminate population-related issues. The position was granted on a local level based on the mutual agreements of a city council in plenary meetings. Often, the occupation was honorary, unpaid, and stationed for life. In modern usage, the term usually refers to a type of journalist who writes chronicles as a form of journalism or non-professional historical documentation.

Cronista in the Middle Ages
Before the development of modern journalism and the systematization of chronicles as a journalistic genre, cronista were tasked with narrating chronological events considered worthy of remembrance that were recorded year by year. Unlike writers who created epic poems regarding living figures, cronista recorded historical events in the lives of individuals in an ostensibly truthful and reality-oriented way. 
Even from the time of early Christian historiography, cronistas were clearly expected to place human history in the context of a linear progression, starting with the creation of man until the second coming of Christ, as prophesied in biblical texts.

Alphabetical list of notable chronicles 

History of Alam Aray Abbasi – Safavid dynasty
Alamgirnama – Mughal Empire
Altan Tobchi - Mongol Empire
Anglo-Saxon Chronicle – England
 Annales Bertiniani – West Francia
Annales Cambriae – Wales
Annales seu cronicae incliti Regni Poloniae – Poland
Annals of Inisfallen – Ireland
Annals of Lough Cé – Ireland
Annals of the Four Masters – Ireland
Annals of Spring and Autumn – China
Annals of Thutmose III – Ancient Egypt
The Annals of the Choson Dynasty – Korea
Babylonian Chronicles – Mesopotamia
Anonymous Bulgarian Chronicle – Bulgaria
Bodhi Vamsa – Sri Lanka
Books of Chronicles attributed to Ezra – Israel
Buranji – Ahoms, Assam, India
Cāmadevivaṃsa – Northern Thailand
Culavamsa – Sri Lanka
(Chronica Polonorum): see Gesta principum Polonorum
Cheitharol Kumbaba – Manipur, India
 Chronica Gentis Scotorum
Chronica seu originale regum et principum Poloniae – Poland
Chronicon of Eusebius
Chronicon Scotorum – Ireland
Chronicon of Thietmar of Merseburg
Chronicle (Crònica) by Ramon Muntaner – 13th/14th-century Crown of Aragon. Third and longest of the Grand Catalan Chronicles.
Chronicle of Finland (Chronicon Finlandiae) by Johannes Messenius – Finland
Dioclean Priest's Chronicle – Europe
Chronicle of the Slavs – Europe
Chronicle of Greater Poland – Poland
Chronica Hungarorum – History of Hungary
Chronicle of Jean de Venette – France
Chronicle of the Bishops of England (De Gestis Pontificum Anglorum) by William of Malmesbury
Chronicle of the Kings of England (De Gestis Regum Anglorum) by William of Malmesbury
Chronographia – 11th century History of the Eastern Roman Empire (Byzantium) by Michael Psellos
Comentarios Reales de los Incas
Conversion of Kartli – Georgia
Cronaca- Chronicle of Cyprus from the 4th up to the 15th century by Cypriot chronicler Leontios Machairas
Cronaca fiorentina – Chronicle of Florence up to the end of the 14th Century by Baldassarre Bonaiuti
Cronicae et gesta ducum sive principum Polonorum – Poland
Croyland Chronicle – England
Dawn-Breakers (Nabil's Narrative) – Baháʼí Faith and Middle East
Dipavamsa – Sri Lanka
Divan of the Abkhazian Kings – Georgia
Eric Chronicles – Sweden
Eusebius Chronicle – Mediterranean and Middle East
Fragmentary Annals of Ireland – Ireland
Froissart's Chronicles – France and Western Europe
Galician-Volhynian Chronicle – Ukraine
Georgian Chronicles – Georgia
Gesta Normannorum Ducum – Normandy
Gesta principum Polonorum
Grandes Chroniques de France – France
General Estoria by Alfonso X – c. 1275-1284 Castile, Spain.
Henry of Livona Chronicle – Eastern Europe
Historia Ecclesiastica – Norman England
 Historia Scholastica by Petrus Comestor - 12th century France
 The Historie and Chronicles of Scotland, Robert Lindsay of Pitscottie
History of the Prophets and Kings – Middle East and Mediterranean
Hustyn Chronicle – Eastern Europe
Jami' al-tawarikh by Rashid-al-Din Hamadani - Universal history
Jans der Enikel – Europe and Mediterranean
Jerome's Chronicle – Mediterranean and Middle East
Jinakalamali – Northern Thailand
Joannis de Czarnkow chronicon Polonorum – Poland
Kaiserchronik – Central and southern Europe, Germany
Kano Chronicle – Nigeria
Khulasat-ut-Tawarikh by Sujan Rai - History of India
Khwaday-Namag - History of Persia
Kojiki - Japan
Lethrense Chronicle – Denmark
Libre dels Feyts – Book of the Deeds by James I of Aragon, first of the Grand Catalan Chronicles
Madala Panji – Chronicle of the Jagannath Temple in Puri, India, related to the History of Odisha
Mahavamsa – Sri Lanka
Maronite Chronicle – The Levant, anonymous annalistic chronicle in the Syriac language completed shortly after 664. 
Manx Chronicle – Isle of Man
Nabonidus Chronicle – Mesopotamia
Nihon Shoki - Japan
Nuova Cronica – Florence
Nuremberg Chronicle
Paschale Chronicle – Mediterranean
Primary Chronicle – Eastern Europe
Puranas – India
Rajatarangini – Kashmir
Roit and Quheil of Tyme – Scotland, Adam Abell
Roskildense Chronicle – Denmark
Royal Frankish Annals – Frankish Empire
Scotichronicon – by the Scottish historian Walter Bower
Shahnama-yi-Al-i Osman by Fethullah Arifi Çelebi – Ottoman empire (1300 ac – the end of Sultan Suleyman I's reign) which is the fifth volume of it Süleymanname
Skibby Chronicle – Danish Latin chronicle from the 1530s
Swiss illustrated chronicles – Switzerland
Timbuktu Chronicles – Mali
Zizhi Tongjian – China

See also 
 Books of Chronicles
 Chronicles of Nepal
 List of English chronicles
 Medieval Chronicle Society

References

External links 
 

 
Medieval literature
Works about history